Tornatellinops ponapensis is a species of minute air-breathing land snail, a terrestrial pulmonate gastropod mollusc or micromollusc in the family Achatinellidae. This species is endemic to Micronesia.

References

Fauna of Micronesia
ponapensis
Taxonomy articles created by Polbot